Voxant was a new-media syndication company based in Herndon, Virginia, in the United States.  Voxant was a privately held company which was founded in 2004 by investors from Longworth Venture Partners of Waltham, Massachusetts.  Longworth acquired the assets of the news transcription company Morningside Partners of Lanham, Maryland, in order to form a new news video "search engine" using Morningsides' 10 year library of transcribed news and licensed news video.

In 2005, Voxant hired former LexisNexis and IBM executive, Jeff Crigler as Chief Executive Officer, to recruit a management team and develop the new service offering.  Founding executives also included former Oracle sales and marketing executive Susan Kearney, top IBM technologist Ben Steinberg, and content industry veteran Art Bushnell.

In April 2006, Voxant launched its new media network, syndicating fully licensed news and information content to Web publishers and bloggers.  By 2007 over 35,000 Web publishers and bloggers are members of the network.  Content distributed by Voxant includes news clips, stories, and images from about 250 sources including The New York Times, The Wall Street Journal, CBS News, MTV News, Reuters, The Associated Press, Agence France Presse and New York Financial Press.

Leadership
In July 2005, Internet industry veteran, Jeff Crigler, appointed as founding Chief Executive Officer.
In January 2008, Former AOL executive, Marcien Jenckes was appointed to the position of Chief Executive Officer.  Former CEO, Jeff Crigler assumed the role of President.

Investors
Voxant's investors include Court Square Ventures, Longworth Venture Partners, and Softbank Capital.

External links
 Voxant: Giving Riches to the Niches Next Great Thing discusses Daryn Kagan's relationship with Voxant
Voxant is up for an award   Voxant is nominated for a Codie
Kang, Stephanie. "A Wider Web to Find Their Niche", The Wall Street Journal, Oct. 30, 2007.

Companies established in 2004
Companies based in Reston, Virginia
Mass media companies of the United States